Florence Hinckel (13 December 1973) is a French writer.

Works 
 . Yannis, Nathan - Syros, 2015
 Populaire ?, Rageot, 2015
 Le chastronaute, Nathan, 2015
 #Bleue, Syros, series Soon, 2015
 Super-Louis et l'île aux quarante crânes, Sarbacane, series Pepix, 2014
 Hors de moi, Talents Hauts, series Ego, 2014
 Chat va faire mal, Nathan, 2014
 Quatre filles et Quatre garçons, Talents Hauts, 2014
 Le chat beauté, Nathan, 2013.
 Secrets.com, Rageot, 2013
 Théa pour l'éternité, Syros, 2012.
 L'été où je suis né, Gallimard Jeunesse, series Scripto, 2011.
 Le Chat Pitre, Nathan, 2011.
 Grave in love, tome 8 de La ligne 15, Talents hauts, 2011.
 Révoltée, tome 7 de La ligne 15, Talents hauts, 2011.
 Zéro commentaire, tome 6 de La ligne 15, Talents hauts, 2011.
 Une fille sans faille, tome 5 de La ligne 15, Talents hauts, 2011.
 T'es pas cap, tome 4 de La ligne 15, Talents hauts, 2010.
 Plus belle tu meurs, tome 3 de La ligne 15, Talents hauts, 2010.
 Toutes les filles de la Terre, tome 2 de La ligne 15, Talents hauts, 2010.
 Ma métamorphose, tome 1 de La ligne 15, Talents hauts, 2010.
 A toi, Oskar, 2010.
 Vanilles et Chocolats, Oskar, 2010.
 Le Maillot de bain, Talents hauts, 2009.
 Les Copains, le soleil et Nabila, Gallimard Jeunesse, series Folio Junior, 2009.
 Le chocolat magique, Averbode, series Tirelire, 2008
 Ma mère est maire, Talents hauts, 2008.
 La Fille qui dort, Les 400 coups, 2007.
 Confidences entre filles, Rageot, 2007.
 Le Lézard de l'Alcazar, Le lutin Malin, 2007.
 Amoïlena, Le Griffon Bleu, 2006.
 La Guerre des vanilles, Magnard, 2006. Trophée 2008 Livre mon ami
 Clopes en stock, Rouge Safran, 2005.
 Le Panier aux mystères, Rouge Safran, 2003.

Publications in papers 
 L'été où je suis né, Je Bouquine, Bayard Presse, 2010.
 Mon voyage sur Terre, Dlire, Bayard Presse, 2012

External links 
 Site officiel
 Florence Hinckel on MEL
 Florence Hinckel - U4 : Yannis on YouTube

French children's writers
French women children's writers
21st-century French non-fiction writers
Prix Sainte-Beuve winners
1973 births
Living people
21st-century French women writers